Mutsu may refer to:

Places 

 Mutsu, Aomori, a city in Aomori prefecture, Japan
 Mutsu Province, one of the old provinces of Japan
 Mutsu Bay, a bay inside Aomori Prefecture, Japan
 Mutsu, Estonia, a village in Vastseliina Parish, Võru County, Estonia

People 
 Mutsu Munemitsu (1844–1897), diplomat in Japan during the Meiji period
 Mutsu Hirokichi (1869–1942), Japanese diplomat and an educator in Meiji and Taishō period Japan
 Iso Mutsu (1867–1930), author of the first guide to Kamakura ever written

Other uses 
 , a 1970 merchant ship that was Japan's only nuclear-powered ship
 , a 1920 battleship of the Imperial Japanese Navy
 Bluefish, a sushi/sashimi ingredient
 Mutsu (apple), a yellow-gold apple also known as Crispin
 The fictional Mutsu clan in the manga and anime series Shura no Toki - Age of Chaos
 Mutsu Kokubun-ji Yakushidō, the provincial temple of former Mutsu Province, Japan
 Mutsu Tonohohon, an action video game released in 2002 by Tomy

See also